Saim Arıkan (born 28 July 1906, date of death unknown) was a Turkish wrestler. He competed at the 1928 Summer Olympics and the 1936 Summer Olympics.

References

External links
 

1906 births
Year of death missing
Turkish male sport wrestlers
Olympic wrestlers of Turkey
Wrestlers at the 1928 Summer Olympics
Wrestlers at the 1936 Summer Olympics
Place of birth missing